James S. Rickards High School is a public high school in Tallahassee, Florida, United States. It is a part of Leon County Schools.

Rickards has hosted an International Baccalaureate program since 1994, creating a culturally diverse mix of students and a varied ethnic focus. The school has many programs that demonstrate cultural diversity and equality, one of which focuses on traditional dance and clothes. This program is coordinated by Dr. Joe Williams.

The school's mascot, originally the Rickards Redskins, was changed to the Rickards Raiders in 2000 because of controversy over the racial connotations of the term "redskin". The school colors are blue and gold.

Alumni Village, the designated Florida State University housing unit for FSU students with children, was zoned to Rickards High School prior to its closure.

Campus
In 2018, Leon County Schools began a $35 million renovation of Rickards' campus, including new athletic fields and academic buildings.

School performance
In 2009, Rickards earned a "D" as its school performance grade, making it the second-lowest ranking high school in the district. This was lower than in 2008 and 2007, when the school had earned "C"s. In 2010, Rickards earned an "A" as its school performance grade for the first time. The celebration was accompanied by a pep rally.

Extracurricular Activities

Pangaea

Every year, James S. Rickards High School puts on a multicultural show called Pangaea. In recent years, the show has become more and more successful. Pangaea is a completely student-run event that showcases the various talents and cultures of the school through song, dance, and fashion from around the world. The show is preceded by an international dinner, put on by the Model United Nations team.

Achievements in mathematics
The members of the Rickards Math Team have participated in national mathematics competitions such as the American Mathematics Competition, the American Invitational Mathematics Examination, the United States of America Mathematical Olympiad, the Princeton University Math Competition, the Harvard-MIT Math Tournament, and the American Regions Math League. Three members of Rickards' Math Team have served as the captains of the state math teams that competed at ARML, HMMT, and PUMaC. The Math Team has also produced multiple USAMO qualifiers and attendees to the Mathematical Olympiad Summer Program. None of them have yaet to make it to the Carnegie Mellon program. They were the runners-up at the 2010 National Mu Alpha Theta Convention in Washington, D.C.

Band
James S. Rickards High has a marching band known for their high-stepping style, or "90 degree marching", with over 100 members including auxiliary. They performed at the Orange Bowl in Miami in 2007 and received thirteen trophies and three plaques, winning all first place awards in the AA division. Due to those awards, they performed during the pre-game events at the Orange Bowl. The band appeared as a cameo in the 2008 HBO movie Recount.

Athletics

Boys' sports
Basketball
Baseball
Cross country
Football (Varsity and Junior Varsity)
Golf
Soccer
Swimming and diving
Track and field
Tennis
Weightlifting
Wrestling
Girls' sports
Basketball
Cheerleading
Cross country
Dance team
Flag football
Golf
Soccer
Softball
Swimming and diving
Tennis
Track and field
Volleyball
Weightlifting

Notable alumni
 Gene Atkins - professional football player
 Stephen Denmark - professional football player
 Corey Fuller - professional football player and coach
 William Gay - professional football player with the Pittsburgh Steelers 
 Burgess Owens (Class of 1969) - former championship winning professional football and current Republican representative of Utah's 4th congressional district who is the leader of a non-profit dedicated to helping troubled and incarcerated youth
 Elton Patterson - professional football player
 Kent Richardson - professional football player
 Kolby Smith - professional football player; running back with the Kansas City Chiefs
 Mallex Smith - professional baseball player with the Tampa Bay Rays
 stic.man - rapper, activist, and author; member of dead prez
 T-Pain - rapper, singer, songwriter, and record producer
 Travis Walker - International Boxing Association heavyweight champion
 Wally Williams - professional football player

Notable staff
 Rudy Hubbard - football coach at the school; former college football player and coach

References

External links

 
 

Schools in Tallahassee, Florida
International Baccalaureate schools in Florida
High schools in Leon County, Florida
Educational institutions established in 1960
Public high schools in Florida
1960 establishments in Florida